Tense Nervous Headache is the second solo studio album by English singer Boy George, released in October 1988 by Virgin Records. While the album was withdrawn from sale in the United Kingdom, it was still released in Europe but was not released by Virgin in the United States. The title was a reference to a UK television commercial for Anadin.

Background
When the recordings for the album began, Boy George, in his own words, did not know if he wanted to be Prince, Bowie, or Roy Orbison. He started working with Prince-collaborator Bobby Z. but was at the same time inspired by the growing acid house scene and garage music which he had already explored on his protest single "No Clause 28" (UK No. 57) earlier in the year. At one point, Pete Waterman had also been suggested as a producer although no recordings were initiated. Teddy Riley was then flown in from the US to record four new jack swing titles which Boy George was ultimately not happy with and asked to be left off the album. Vlad Naslas wrote and produced a number of dance tracks which Boy George found difficult to write lyrics to, and as a consequence only "I Go Where I Go" made it to the final tracklist. Mike Pela was brought in to contribute three tracks to finish off the album, including a cover version of Jimmy Ruffin's "What Becomes of the Brokenhearted". "Finally, and too late, I was feeling the inspiration", Boy George would later tell in his biography Take It Like a Man, eventually calling the album "self-indulgent, scatterbrained, and painfully out of touch." He still went ahead with a concert tour, "Boy's Own Tour", performing eight of the new tracks, with one show being filmed for a Japanese TV-special.

Commercial performance
The album had been scheduled for an October 1, 1988 release in the UK but was postponed for three weeks to see if sales from the first single "Don't Cry" (released in September) would pick up. When the single stalled at No. 60 in the UK Singles Chart, Virgin eventually decided to pull the album from sale in the UK. It was still released in Europe where it would reach No. 46 in the Swedish charts  and No. 38 in Italy. Following its disappointing sales, Virgin quickly released a new album, Boyfriend, in March 1989 with the four previously unreleased Teddy Riley tracks, three other left-over tracks, and the single-only track "No Clause 28" from the previous year.

Singles
"Don't Cry" was the only single released from album. Featuring a more crooner-style vocal, emulating Roy Orbison, it peaked at No. 60 in the UK charts but became a Top 20 hit in Italy where it reached No. 13. "No Clause 28", released in June 1988, would not be included on the final album, except on the Japanese release. "A Boy Called Alice" and "Leave In Love" (a duet with Carroll Thompson) were released as B-sides only.

Track listing
The LP included 9 titles, while the CD & MC editions included 12 titles. The song "Something Strange Called Love" was edited on the LP.

MC: Side 1 (Trk. 1 to 4 + trk. 10 & 11), Side 2 (Trk. 5 to 9 + trk. 12).

Singles
"Don't Cry" (4:06 Edit) (September 1988)

B-sides
"Leave in Love" – Featuring Carroll Thompson (O'Dowd, Bobby Z.)
"A Boy Called Alice" - (O'Dowd, Vic Martin)

Other songs
"No Clause 28" (June 1988 single, included as a bonus track on Japanese album only)

Personnel

Musicians

 Boy George –  lead vocals
 Glenn Nightingale –  guitars and other voices
 Ian Maidman –  bass, keyboards
 Bobby Z. –  drums
 Amanda Vincent – keyboards
Vic Martin –  keyboards
 Richie Stevens –  drums ("Kipsy")
 Derek Green –  other voices
Carroll Thompson –  other voices
Helen Terry –  other voices
Beverley Skeete –  other voices
Belva Haney –  other voices
Wendell Morrison –  other voices
Juliet Roberts, Nevada Cato –  other voices
 David Ulm, Carol Steel –  percussion
 Jagdeep Singh –  tabla and other voices
 Simon Tyrell –  drum programming
Andy Dewar – drum programming
 Anne Dudley –  all string arrangements
 Kenny Wellington –  brass section
David "Baps" Baptiste – brass section
Nat Augustin – brass section
Sid Gauld  – brass section
 Ed Jones – major saxophone
 Desmond Foster –  other bass
 MC Kinky (Caron Geary) – toasting ("Kipsy")
 Paul Lee – choir ("Mama Never Knew")
Iris Sutherland – choir ("Mama Never Knew")
Yvonne White – choir ("Mama Never Knew")
 Jock Loveband – engineer
 Alan Douglas – engineer
Martin White – engineer
 Teri Reed – engineer
Paul Wright – engineer
Renny Hill – engineer
Phil Legg – engineer
Robin Evans – engineer

Production
Bobby Z. –  producer tracks 1, 2, 4, 5, 7, 9 & 11
Boy George & Mike Pela - producer tracks 6, 8 & 10
Vlad Naslas - producer track 3
Jeremy Healy - producer track 12

Charts and certifications

Weekly charts

Release history

References

1988 albums
Pop rock albums by English artists
Boy George albums
Virgin Records albums